The Caribana Festival in Crans-près-Céligny, Vaud, Switzerland started in 1990 as an opportunity for people in Switzerland to enjoy live music at the shores of Lake Léman.  The event has grown over the years and changed from a free, small, local festival to an international event with 19,500 visitors in 2005.

Caribana lasts for four days (Thursday to Sunday) and offers a variety of artists. It is not, as its name suggests, an event devoted to Caribbean music.

Yearly lineups

1990
Patrick Chambaz, Sun Set Band, The Gang

1991
The Caribana committee organized the Swiss 700th anniversary in Crans-près-Céligny.

1992
Early Morning, Hinterland, Hot Bananas Ladies, Mauro Sabbioni, No Comment, Of Inimiura, Paradox, Sa-Kaïl, Sakaryn, The Hedgehogs

1993
Arnold the Pig, C-45, Luka Bloom, Pacemaker, Saraba, Taboo, Totem, Woo Loo Moo Loo

1994
Barking Dogs, Human Spirits, La Frontera, Metro, Mory Kanté, Peeping Tom, The Shoulders, The Ventilators

1995
Andy White & The Alt, Beverly Jo Scott, BUM-Based Upon Movement, Grand Mother Funk, Horny Spirits, Laugh, Malka Family, Mother Earth, Nawari, Rude luck, Zouk Machine

1996
Anaemia, Angélique Kidjo, Daran & les Chaises, FFF, Gispy Land, Luka Bloom, Pablo U-WA, Shane MacGowan, SPanic Kiff, The Blues Brothers Band, Wild Mango

1997
Barrio Chino, Calvin Russel, Massimo Massini, OMC, ORS Massive, Paul Young, Pull, Sawt el Atlas, Swiss Cheese, Te Vaka, The Silencers, Urban Species, Zebda

1998
Core, Diana King, Dr John, Faithless, Glen of Guinness, Gossip, H-Blockx, Humbert, Humbert, Ian Brown, Monica Lypso, One for the Road, Papa Fred, Silmarils, Spice, Toots & the Maytals, Verdura Fresca

1999
Alabina, Anouk, Babylon Circus, Blankass, Carole Fredericks, CrawlinKingsnake, Jiripoca, Keb Mo, Mobs et Travaux, Noï, Sens Unik, The Creatures, The Twinkle Brothers, Touré Kunda, Yves Z.

2000
Afro Cuban All Stars, Amadou et Mariam, Andy Smith, Aswad, Björn Again, Bonny B., Daran, Delphine, Favez, Kid Creole and the Coconuts, Laugh, Lyn©, Morpheus, P18, Paco Sery, Sam Seale, Small Fry, Spectron, Zapping Buzz Band, Zorg

2001
Alpha Blondy, Ciderman, Daytona, Glen of Guinness, Ks Choice, Liquido, Liz Libido, Lunazone, Ones, Pedro Luis e a parede, Phoenix, Popa Chubby, Sergent Garcia, Steel Pulse, thePark

2002
Beverley Knight, Bryan Ferry, Chewy, Chitty Chitty Bang Bang, Dada Ante Portas, Gee K., Guess What, Khaled, Marianne Faithfull, Matt, Morocco, Natalia M. King, Orishas, Sinclair, Sinsemilia, Sonalp

2003
Astonvilla, Clawfinger, Earth Wind & Fire Experience, Émilie Simon, Fargo, Gigi Moto, Lee Perry, Magic System, Napoleon Washington, Patrice, Polar, Popmonster, Saïan Supa Crew, Saybia, Tim Patience Watch, Tom McRae, Zebda, Zorg

2004
Main stage: Corneille, Dolly, Jammin (band), Kamilean, Kinky, Magicrays, Nickelback, Open Season, Paul Personne,  Paul Quadri, Red, Sarah Bettens, Simple Minds, Supergrass, The Peter Tosh Celebration, The Underwater, Yuri Buenaventura

2005
Main stage: Amadou & Mariam, Bluedaze, Demilliac, Eagle-Eye Cherry, Gingala, Izul, Jimmy Cliff, Les palabres bleues, Lima Djari, Lovebugs, Luke, Magyd Cherfi, Mass Hysteria, Moby, Morcheeba, Mouss & Hakim, Natasha Bedingfield, Oni/Epik, Brayndead Freakshow, Orishas, Papa Roach, Patatas Chipas Club

2006
Angélique Kidjo, Archive, Jamait, Jarabe De Palo, Kalash, Kandlbauer, Lole, Matt Costa, Mattafix, Minimum Serious, Mosquito, Nelly Furtado, Phoenix, Sergent Garcia, Skin, Skye, Starsailor, Sunshiners, William White

2007
Evanescence, Good Charlotte, P.M.T, The Passengers, Piers Faccini, Myband, The Servant, Patti Smith, Aloan, Babet, Under The Influence of Giants, Macy Gray, Israel Vibration, Sally Nyolo, Lunik, Solo dos

2008
Alanis Morissette, Admiral T, Mina feat. Mich Gerber, Simongad, Simple Plan, Stereophonics, Manic Street Preachers, Atomic Shelters, Redwood, The Young Gods, Kate Nash, Keziah Jones, Patrice, D.o.M, bconnected, Infadels, Mademoiselle K, Maroon 5, Boy George, Laure Perret, Sumo, My Federation

2009
Main stage: Lovebugs, ZZ Top, Kris Dane, Duff McKagan

Side stages: Editors, Travis, Chris Cornell, Fink (UK), Fuse Factory, Wipe Out, Fullblast, Poni Hoax, Dub Incorporation, Madcon, Stress, UB40, Sand, Hindi Zahra, Project5, Junior Tshaka, Tweek, Nneka, Dan Black, Katy Perry, Charlie Winston, Thomas Dutronc, Licia Chery, Krystle Warren, Krash on Earth, Victori4, Dorian Gray, Yoav

2010
Main stage: The Baseballs, Deep Purple, Hells Kitchen, Kassidy, Sum 41, OneRepublic, Thirty Seconds to Mars, Stevans, DeVotchKa

Side stages: Polar, Charlie, Oi Va Voi, Micky Green, Faithless, Yodelice, The Asteroids Galaxy Tour, Lea Lu, Thomas Dybdahl, Moonraisers, Sean Paul, Madness, Luka Bloom, Mama Rosin, Ralf Hartmann, Neil Halstead

2011

Main stage: Justin Nozuka, Texas, Wolfmother, Interpol, Hurts, Plan B, Morcheeba, OMD, Julian Marley, Abd al Malik, Kool and the gang 

Side stages: Kirsty, Lissie, Marc Sway, Kassidy, Favez, Plain White T's, Misty Miller, Azazelblue's, Solange la Frange, Guess What, Little Dragon, Ndidi O, Guillaume Grand, Saint André, Medi, I blame Coco, Jaïlyna, Ben Howard

2012

Main stage : Pony Pony Run Run, Gossip, Everlast, Kasabian, Gorillaz Sound System, Dropkick Murphys, Lou Reed, The Specials, Grand Corps Malade, Charlie Winston, Keziah Jones, 2manydjs

Side stages : Kyasma, The Rambling Wheels, Motherrockers, The Cyborgs, Lou Lesage, Revolver, Marina and the Diamonds, Lucy Rose, Haight Ashbury, The Minutes, Pegasus, Stephen Marley, Lail Arad, Jennie Abrahamson, Elkee, Vintage Trouble, Raphelson, Foy Vance

2013

Main stage : The Kills, Skunk Anansie , 77 Bombay Street, Archive, Kaiser Chiefs, Raggasonic, Sexion d'Assaut, Tinie Tempah, Fun, Zaz

Side stages : Kill It Kid, The Animen, The Coronas, Take Me Home, Andy Burrows, The Heavy, Aya Waska, Tarrus Riley, Birdy Nam Nam, Célien Schneider, Imagine Dragons, The Jim Jones Revue

2014

Main stage : Ska-P, Pixies, Kodaline, Miles Kane, Queens of the Stone Age, Youssoupha, Jessie J, IAM, Bastian Baker, Passenger, Tom Odell

Side stages : Polar Circles, Blood Red Shoes, The Pretty Reckless, La Petite P*****, Mike Arthur Le Trèfle, DJ Sancho, Aliose, George Barnett, The Crags, Xinobi, Keiko Was Great, Mr Chug, Ska Nerfs, Rootwords, Naughty Boy, DJives , Woody and Buzz, We Love Machines, DJ Vidy, Deadboyz ,DJ Nico, Stu Larsen, Jan Oliver, Kadebostany, Max Romeo, Lazercat, Ezekiel, Daniel Cooper, Jack v, DJ Phidrix

External links
Caribana Festival

Tourist attractions in the canton of Vaud
Music festivals in Switzerland
Recurring events established in 1990